The Story of the Nations Library was a historical book series started by the British publisher Thomas Fisher Unwin in 1885. The series was published in the USA by G. P. Putnam, though not in identical form.

See also
Heroes of the Nations series

Notes

Series of history books